Cris Groenendaal is a retired American stage actor. He has performed in the Broadway productions of The Phantom of the Opera, Sunday in the Park with George, Sweeney Todd: The Demon Barber of Fleet Street, A Funny Thing Happened on the Way to the Forum, and Passion.

Career
Known for his work in Stephen Sondheim's musicals, he made his Broadway debut in the original cast of Sweeney Todd: The Demon Barber of Fleet Street as an ensemble member and understudy for the role of Anthony. He would later replace Victor Garber in the role. He was also in the original cast of the first national tour of Sweeney Todd reprising his role of Anthony. He also appeared in the 1982 televised recording of the production.

Groenendaal was also in the original cast of Sunday in the Park with George originating the roles of Billy Webster and Louis while understudying many roles including the titular role. He also played the roles of a Soldier/Alex during Robert Westenberg's vacation and the titular roles of Georges Seurat/George for 5 days.

Groenendaal originated the role of Monsieur Gilles André in the original Broadway cast of The Phantom of the Opera also understudying the role of Raoul, Vicomte de Chagny. He would later take over the role of The Phantom on Broadway and later reprise the role in the Canadian production and tour.

In 1994 and 1996 he would play roles in two Sondheim musicals, the Broadway revival of A Funny Thing Happened on the Way to the Forum and the original Broadway production of Passion. Playing Miles Gloriosus and Major Rizzolli respectively.

Acting credits

Theatre 
Source:

References 

Living people
1948 births
American male musical theatre actors
20th-century American actors
21st-century American actors